Panyin may refer to:

Kwaku Dua I Panyin ( 1797–1867), Asantehene
Osei Kwame Panyin (died 1803), Asantehene